The Senior CLASS Award is presented each year to the outstanding senior NCAA Division I Student-Athlete of the Year in women's basketball.  The award was established in 2002.

External links
 Official site

References

College basketball trophies and awards in the United States
College women's basketball in the United States
Student athlete awards in the United States
Sports awards honoring women
Awards established in 2002
2002 establishments in the United States
College basketball player of the year awards in the United States
Lists of women's basketball players in the United States